Catherine Howard, Countess of Suffolk ( Knyvet/Knyvett;
1564–1638) was an English court office holder who served as lady-in-waiting to the queen consort of England, Anne of Denmark.

Private life 
She was born in Charlton Park, Wiltshire, the oldest child of Sir Henry Knyvet (or Knyvett) and his wife, Elizabeth Stumpe. Her uncle was Sir Thomas Knyvet (or Knyvett), who foiled the "Gunpowder Plot".

Early in her life, she married Richard Rich, son of Robert Rich, 2nd Baron Rich, and grandson of Richard Rich, 1st Baron Rich. After his death in 1580, she married Sir Thomas Howard, who, twenty years later, was named the Earl of Suffolk.

On the death of her father in 1598, she inherited Charlton Park, Wiltshire, which thereafter became the seat of the Earls of Suffolk.

Courtier 

Howard gained a place in Queen Elizabeth's bedchamber and the title of Keeper of the Jewels in 1599. She continued to hold comparable positions after the Union of the Crowns in the reign of James VI and I. On 8 June 1603 King James sent her north to meet Anne of Denmark with some of Elizabeth's jewels from the Tower of London. Howard became a lady of drawing chamber to Anne of Denmark, and keeper of her jewels until 1608.

According to Arbella Stuart, Anne asked the Countess of Suffolk and Audrey Walsingham to select some of Elizabeth's old clothes from a store in the Tower of London for a masque in January 1604, The Vision of the Twelve Goddesses. Howard danced in two of the queen's masques, one of which was written by Ben Jonson, titled The Masque of Blackness. King James wanted the actors to look African so the actors painted their faces black. In 1611, the poet Emilia Lanier chose to dedicate her poem Salve Deus Rex Judaeorum to her.

She was granted authority over the lodgings at Greenwich Palace where Anne gave birth to the Princess Sophia in 1606. She was in such a position of high esteem within the court, she would have been given the honour of being a godmother if the child had not perished.

Howard strove successfully to gain rank in court but proved to be corrupt. She served as a liaison between Spain and the Earl of Salisbury, and demanded bribes for doing so. Her husband Thomas Howard was appointed Lord Treasurer, which allowed her more opportunity for financial gain. She was beautiful in her younger years, and during her time at court had many suitors and a string of alleged love affairs, using the position her husband achieved in the government to extort kickbacks from her lovers. 

However, in 1619, at the age of 55, she was the victim of an attack of smallpox. According to Lady Anne Clifford, this "spoiled that good face of hers, which had brought to other much misery and to herself greatness which ended with much unhappiness". Many of the details of her corruption came out in the Suffolk's trial in the same year, where Sir John Finet alleged "to be spared a bond of £500, a citizen gave £83 and a sable muff to the countess".

The Countess was ultimately caught and, as a result of her treachery, she and her family were banned from court. Peers generally sympathised with the Earl for being caught in her web of corruption, and she endured the brunt of the blame for their fall from grace. After being expelled from court, she continued to write letters on behalf of others seeking court positions.

Portrait at Gorhambury 
Thomas Pennant wrote in his Journey from Chester to London published in 1782 wrote of her portrait then at Gorhambury, Hertfordshire:In the room is a fine full-length of the countess of Suffolk, daughter of Sir Henry Knevit, and wife to the lord treasurer.  She is dressed in white, and in a great ruff; her breasts much exposed: her waist short and swelling; for she was extremely prolific.  This lady had unhappily a great ascendancy over her husband, and was extremely rapacious.  She made use of his exalted situation to indulge her avarice, and took bribes from all quarters.  Sir Francis Bacon, in his speech in the star-chamber against her husband, wittily compares her to an exchange-woman, who kept her shop, while Sir John Bingley, a teller of the Exchequer, and a tool of her’s, cried What d’ye lack?  Her beauty was remarkable, and I fear the made a bad use of her charms.  “Lady Suffolk,” says the famous Anne Clifford, in her diary, under the year 1619, “had the smallpox at Northampton-house, which spoiled that good face of her’s, which had brought to others much misery, and to herself greatness, which ended in much unhappiness.”An engraving of the portrait by James Caldwall is in the same book on page 228. Sir George Scharf (1820–1895), artist and art historian, first Director and later trustee of the National Portrait Gallery, later drew a sketch of this engraving, which was based on this portrait. George Perfect Harding drew a pencil, watercolour and bodycolour copy of the portrait in 1811. Bodycolour is watercolour which is mixed with white pigment to make it opaque.

Descendants 

 Theophilus Howard, 2nd Earl of Suffolk (1582–1640); married Elizabeth Hume
 Elizabeth Howard (c. 1583–1658); married firstly William Knollys, 1st Earl of Banbury, then Edward Vaux, 4th Baron Vaux of Harrowden 
 Sir Robert Howard (1598–1653); married Catherine Nevill
 Sir William Howard (1586–before 1672)
 Thomas Howard, 1st Earl of Berkshire (1587–1669); married Elizabeth Cecil. Inherited the Wiltshire estates (Charlton Park) that had passed on to his mother after her father's death.
 Catherine Howard (c. 1588–1673); married William Cecil, 2nd Earl of Salisbury
 Frances Howard (1590–1632); married firstly Robert Devereux, 3rd Earl of Essex then Robert Carr, 1st Earl of Somerset
 Sir Charles Howard (1591–21 June 1626); married Mary Fitzjohn
 Henry Howard (1592–1616); married Elizabeth Bassett
 Edward Howard, 1st Baron Howard of Escrick (d. 24 April 1675)
 Margaret Howard (c. 1599 – 1608)

Notes

1564 births
1630s deaths
English countesses
Catherine
Catherine
People of the Elizabethan era
Catherine
Catherine
People from Wiltshire
16th-century English nobility
17th-century English nobility
16th-century English women
17th-century English women
17th-century spies
English ladies-in-waiting
Court of Elizabeth I
Household of Anne of Denmark